New Light, new light, New Lights or new lights may refer to:

 New Light, North Carolina
 New Light, Richland Parish, Louisiana
 New Light (song), a song by John Mayer
 New Light (EP), an EP by the band Moving Mountains
 Old and New Lights, a Protestant concept